MAX Teal, also known as Route 306 and the South Crosstown BRT, is a bus rapid transit line in Calgary, Alberta. Part of Calgary Transit's MAX network, it connects CTrain stations on the Red and Blue lines to the southwest and southeast quadrants of Calgary.

Stations and route
MAX Teal begins in the southwest at Westbrook station on the Blue Line, travelling southeast, partially along the Southwest Transitway where it meets MAX Yellow. MAX Teal stops at Heritage station on the Red Line, before continuing southeast to terminate at Douglas Glen station, the terminus of the future Green Line.

See also 

 MAX Orange
 MAX Yellow
 MAX Purple
 MAX 
 Calgary Transit

References

Teal